Kurzgesagt (German for "In a nutshell" or "in a few words") is a German-made animation and design studio founded by Philipp Dettmer. The studio's YouTube channel focuses on minimalist animated educational content, using the flat and 3D design style. It discusses scientific, technological, political, philosophical, and psychological subjects. Narrated by Steve Taylor, videos on the channel are typically four to sixteen minutes, with many of them available in German through the channel Dinge Erklärt – Kurzgesagt, their Spanish channel En Pocas Palabras - Kurzgesagt, and some of their videos are also available in French, Hindi, Arabic, Brazilian Portuguese, Japanese and Korean.

With over 20 million subscribers and over 160 videos, the studio's original English language channel was ranked as the world's 198th most subscribed as of 8 November 2022.

History 

The Kurzgesagt YouTube channel was created on 10 July 2013, shortly after the founder, Philipp Dettmer, graduated from Munich University of Applied Sciences. The first video, which explained evolution, was published two days later with the voice of Steve Taylor, who still serves as commentator as of 2023. The videos were more popular than expected, and in six years the channel went from a project worked on during Dettmer's free time to a design studio with over forty employees. The studio has even received commissions and grants from a number of established, independent institutions.

In 2015, Kurzgesagt was commissioned to create a video on the end of disease by the Bill and Melinda Gates Foundation.

This video about the COVID-19 pandemic, called The Coronavirus Explained & What You Should Do and released in March 2020, was posted on all three of their channels and shared how the human body responds to COVID-19 and how effective the measures in evading SARS-CoV-2. The English version has over 87 million views, making it the most viewed video on the channel. A study published in Visual Resources, said that the video "is an example of an aesthetically compelling explanation of the biological processes of a Covid infection" and it "includes fantastical depictions that convey the message in a more comprehensible straightforward manner."

Outside of the grants from patrons, Kurzgesagt, at least the German branch, was primarily financially supported by the network Funk of ARD and ZDF since 28 September 2017. Kurzgesagt's German Branch announced their departure from Funk on 19 January 2023.

Kurzgesagt has been the recipient of several awards. In 2019, Kurzgesagt became the first German channel to surpass 10 million subscribers on YouTube. In December 2020, fellow YouTuber Marques Brownlee honored Kurzgesagt, with his "Streamys Creator Honor" award in the 10th Streamy Awards.

Immune: A journey into the mysterious system that keeps you alive 
In November 2021, Kurzgesagt announced the release of their first book, Immune: A journey into the mysterious system that keeps you alive, written by Phillip Dettmer, the channel's founder.

A publication by the Foundation for the Rights of Future Generations, a German think tank, recommended the book among others for books on the COVID-19 pandemic, describing it as "full of stories of invasion, strategy, defeat, and noble self-sacrifice," in introducing the complex world of the immune system. Daniel M. Davis, the Head of Life Sciences and Professor of Immunology at Imperial College London, described it as "the feast we have been waiting for" due to the public interest in the mechanisms of the immune system (such as Antibodies, T cells, and B cells) during the COVID-19 pandemic, which were "rarely discussed outside of research labs and scientific talks." In the book, the author acknowledges the feedback and help of a Dr. James Gurney, Professor Thomas Brocker, the director of the Munich Institute for Immunology, and Professor Maristela Martins de Camargo of the University of São Paulo.

Sources of funding
In 2015, the channel received a US$570 thousand grant from the Bill and Melinda Gates Foundation who would later become one of their key sponsors; Kurzgesagt have made videos calling for investment on novel technologies the foundation also supports, such as carbon capture and artificial meat, as well as arguing for an optimistic view on the future of climate change and economic inequality, a view shared by Bill Gates.  

In March 2022, Kurzgesagt received 2.97 million euros in a grant via Open Philanthropy, which the channel said was being used for translating their videos to various languages, and for funding the creation of content for TikTok. Open Philanthropy supports positions that Kurzgesagt has defended, such as effective altruism and Longtermism. The channel has also received a smaller grant from the John Templeton Foundation.

In a January 2023 statement, Kurzgesagt stated that 65% of their income from 2020 to 2022 came from viewers via the sale of merchandise from their shop, such as mugs, posters and toys, crowdfunding via Patreon, and Google AdSense revenue, with sponsorships (commercial or institutional) and grants accounting for only 24% of income. The statement also said that the channel treats all data skeptically, that their sources for statements are always given, and that all research work is done in-house, with no editorial influence from sponsors or donors—a condition they say is included in every deal they have signed.

Reliability of videos 
While some commentators have praised Kurzgesagt's videos for their reliability and fact-checking, some of their earlier work received criticism. In 2016, the Art Libraries Society of North America criticized the studio's occasional lack of credible sources and professional consultation, and use of emotive language.

In 2019, Kurzgesagt released a video saying that while they now had all their arguments fact-checked by experts, they had not always done so in the past. They added they were deleting two of their videos from 2015 that failed their current standards, including their video titled "Addiction". A collaboration between Kurzgesagt and journalist Johann Hari, "Addiction" came to be one of the most popular on their channel at the time, despite also being one of their most criticized. The video was accused of misleadingly summarizing the conclusions of the contentious Rat Park experiments; Kurzgesagt acknowledged they had presented one argument as fact, and had not considered other theories on the matter.

See also 
 CGP Grey
 Vsauce
 Tom Scott
 Veritasium

References

External links 
 
 

Education-related YouTube channels
YouTube channels launched in 2013
German YouTubers
Science-related YouTube channels
Patreon creators
English-language YouTube channels
Educational and science YouTubers